Capital punishment was abolished in Burundi on 24 April 2009. Burundi is not a state party to the Second Optional Protocol to the International Covenant on Civil and Political Rights.

However, extrajudicial executions are common in Burundi. On 18 February 2016, Defense Minister Emmanuel Ntahomvukiye stated that the death penalty should be reinstated in Burundi, though this has not happened yet.

References

Burundi
Law of Burundi